Cui Peng (born 3 October 1982), also known as Kelvin Cui, is a Chinese actor. After graduating from the Beijing Film Academy in 2000, he participated in the Singaporean talent show Star Search in 2003 and emerged as the Overall Male Champion and Overall Best Potential Host. He then signed a contract with Singapore's MediaCorp Channel 8 and acted in some of MediaCorp's productions but left the network later.

Filmography

Films

Television series

References

External links
  Cui Peng's website

Living people
1982 births
Male actors from Jinan
Beijing Film Academy alumni
Chinese male film actors
Chinese male television actors
21st-century Chinese male actors